Aristarchus or Aristarch of Tegea (Aristarkhos ho Tegeates) was a Greek tragic poet and a contemporary of Sophocles and Euripides. He lived to be a centenarian, composed seventy plays, and won two tragic victories. Only the titles of three of his plays (Achilles, Asclepius, and Tantalus), along with a single line of the text, have come down to us, although Ennius freely borrowed from his play about Achilles. Among his merits seems to have been that of brevity; for, as Suidas relates, he was "the first one to make his plays of the present length."

References

External links
Ancient Library

Ancient Arcadian poets
Tragic poets
5th-century BC Greek people
Ancient Greek centenarians
Ancient Greek dramatists and playwrights
Men centenarians
5th-century BC writers
Year of birth unknown
Year of death unknown
Tegea
Ancient Tegeans